Phoenix is a wooden roller coaster located at the Knoebels Amusement Resort in Elysburg, Pennsylvania.  Prior to its purchase by Knoebels, its relocation in the mid-1980s, it was operated under the name "The Rocket" at Playland Park in San Antonio, Texas.

History
Phoenix was designed and built by Herb Schmeck and the Philadelphia Toboggan Coasters (PTC). It operated as "The Rocket" at the Playland Park in San Antonio from 1947 until the park's closure in 1980. At its opening, the Rocket was hailed as "the largest roller coaster in the world," with 3200 feet of track and a 78-foot first hill. Knoebels purchased the ride in 1984 and dismantled it starting in January 1985. As there were no blueprints to work with, each individual board was numbered and cataloged on site.

The restored roller coaster opened at Knoebels on June 15, 1985. It was renamed after the mythical phoenix. As the first large-scale wooden roller coaster relocation in many years, Knoebels helped spark a movement for the restoration and relocation of other roller coasters standing but not operating.

Ride experience
Once dispatched, the train makes a right turn out of the station into a pitch-black tunnel. At the end of the tunnel, the train ascends the 78-foot climb up the lift hill. A 72-foot first drop follows. The train then rises up into the first of three turnarounds and crawls around it while unbanked. The train then dives off the turnaround into two consecutive airtime hills, both providing decent airtime. The train then rises into the second turnaround, turns around, and dives off the turnaround. Now adjacent to the lift hill, the train enters a double-up followed immediately by a double-down, delivering 3 pops of great airtime. The final turnaround follows, located adjacent to the first. The infamous finale comes next, with four back-to-back bunny hills, each providing amazing airtime.

Awards and rankings
The Phoenix has consistently ranked among the top 10 roller coasters in various polls such as the annual Golden Ticket Awards from Amusement Today, and has won the Golden Ticket Award itself in the Best Wooden Coaster category in 2018, 2019 and 2021 (there was no competition in 2020 due to COVID-19). It was also awarded the Coaster Landmark designation by ACE.

Modern usage

Since 1986, Knoebels has held the "Phoenix Phall Phun Phest," a yearly October event for roller coaster enthusiasts. In 2001 alone, over 1500 roller coaster and amusement park fans converged on Knoebels, many in costume, to participate in a memorabilia swap meet and use the rides after the park closed to the general public. The event was rated the third best Halloween event in 2008 and 2009 by Amusement Today.

Phoenix facts
Trains - 2 PTC, 1 yellow and 1 orange, 24 passengers each

References

Roller coasters introduced in 1985
1985 establishments in Pennsylvania